Mill City (also, Pine City) is a former settlement in Mono County, California.

Dominating the scene in Mill City are remains of Mammoth Mining Company’s 40-stamp mill, including a large flywheel and stone foundations. Other remains include sunken foundations of additional houses, found among pine trees on a hill above the mill site.

References

Former settlements in Mono County, California
Former populated places in California